"A Little Dive Bar in Dahlonega" is a song co-written and recorded by American country music artist Ashley McBryde. The song was released as her first single on October 16, 2017, and served as the lead-off single to her major label debut album, Girl Going Nowhere, released on Warner Bros. Nashville.

Content
McBryde co-wrote the song with Nicolette Hayford and Jesse Rice, the latter of which drew inspiration for the song based on a real life experience in which he met the woman that would become his wife by chance at a dive bar known as The Crimson Moon in the town of Dahlonega, Georgia after his car broke down leaving Atlanta. The song was written on a day McBryde calls "the worst day ever," a sentiment shared by the other two songwriters when they met up for a writing session, which led to Rice sharing the story that would lead to the creation of the song.

"A Little Dive Bar in Dahlonega" was named one of the 54 Best Songs of 2017 by The New York Times, and one of the Top 25 Best Country Songs of 2017 by Rolling Stone.

Chart performance 
"A Little Dive Bar in Dahlonega" debuted on the Billboard Country Airplay chart at number 59 on the chart dated December 12, 2017.

Weekly charts

Year-end charts

Certifications

References 

2017 songs
2017 debut singles
Ashley McBryde songs
Country ballads
Song recordings produced by Jay Joyce
Songs written by Ashley McBryde
Songs about Georgia (U.S. state)
Warner Records Nashville singles